Amy Katherine Browning; Amy Dugdale; Amy Katherine Dugdale (31 March 1881 – 27 January 1978) was a British Impressionist painter.

Life
Browning was born near Luton in Bedfordshire in 1881. Her parents, Katherine Lucy and James Day Browning would have eight children and she was the second. Her father was a bailiff but in time he became a farmer. She entered the Royal College of Art in 1899 but had to leave in 1901 as she was eldest unmarried daughter and her mother was pregnant.

She was the favourite student of Gerald Moira when scholarships allowed her to return to the Royal College. Moira would send her upstairs to teach the male student painters. She left the college in 1906. She had become friends with Sylvia Pankhurst and together they created an art exhibition for the Women's Social and Political Union at the Prince's Skating Club in 1909. They remained friends and they worked to raise money for the poor during the First World War. Meanwhile, she was teaching, but she also had early success with her painting. In 1913 the French government bought Chequered Shade which had taken the silver medal when it was exhibited at the Paris Salon in 1913. The French also bought The Red Shawl. When the Paris Salon restarted after the war she returned and exhibited regularly taking the gold medal once. Browning was also continuing to exhibit regularly at the Royal Academy and at other international locations. She would sign her paintings "A.K.Browning" to avoid any discrimination based on gender.

Browning spent her time teaching to subsidise her painting. She also took commissions including one of Winston Churchill and another of his wife.

In 1952 her husband, Thomas Cantrell Dugdale, died and she gave up their house and she went to live in a flat in Chelsea. Her great-niece was the actress Joanna Dunham.

Death and legacy
Browning died in Letchworth. She has paintings in Musée Baron Gerard, Bayeux, Luton Museum and Art Gallery, Wolverhampton Museum and Art Gallery, Ipswich Museum and Art Gallery, Kelvingrove Museum and the Royal Academy's collection. Portraits of her are held in the collection of the National Portrait Gallery.

References

1881 births
1978 deaths
20th-century English painters
20th-century English women artists
Alumni of the Royal College of Art
British Impressionist painters
British suffragists
English women painters
People from Luton